Peter John Kaye (born 4 February 1979 in Huddersfield) is an English former professional footballer.

Kaye began his career as a trainee with Huddersfield Town, although he had a trial with Manchester United in 1994. He turned professional in August 1996, and made his league debut came on 4 May 1997 when he replaced Jeremy Illingworth as a second-half substitute in the goalless draw at home to Swindon Town. This was to be his only appearance in the Huddersfield first team and he was released at the end of the following season.

External links

1979 births
Living people
Footballers from Huddersfield
English footballers
Huddersfield Town A.F.C. players
English Football League players
Association football forwards